The Morava is a river in Central Europe, a left tributary of the Danube. It is the main river of Moravia, which derives its name from it. The river originates on the Králický Sněžník mountain in the north-eastern corner of Pardubice Region, near the border between the Czech Republic and Poland and has a vaguely southward trajectory. The lower part of the river's course forms the border between the Czech Republic and Slovakia and then between Austria and Slovakia.

Etymology
Though the German name March may refer to Mark, "border, frontier" (cf. English march), the river's name more probably is derived from Proto-Indo-European *mori, "waters" (mare). It was first documented as Maraha in an 892 deed.

History
The shores of the Morava have been inhabited for a very long time. Agriculture began to be practiced in the Morava valley approximately 7,000 years ago, and fortified settlements began to appear during the New Stone Age.

The lower part of the river, downstream of the confluence with the Thaya at Hohenau an der March, which today marks the Austro-Slovakian border, is one of the oldest national boundaries still extant in continental Europe: it was the eastern boundary of the Carolingian Empire with the Avar Khaganate around 800, and from the 10th century onward marked the border of the Imperial marcha orientalis, later Duchy of Austria, with the Kingdom of Hungary (within the Habsburg monarchy during 1526–1918 because of imperial expansion). During the Cold War, this section of the river was part of the Iron Curtain, forming the frontier between Austria and Czechoslovakia.

In July 1997, the Morava basin (especially its northern and eastern part) was affected by heavy stratiform rain, which lasted several days and caused catastrophic floods, which also affected the Oder River basin in Poland and Germany. In the Czech Republic, 49 people lost their life, more than 250 villages had to be evacuated and the total damage was 63 billion crowns.

History of the river

Course
The river originates in the Králický Sněžník mountains in north-western Moravia, not far from the border with Poland. The lowlands formed by the river are the Upper Moravian Vale or Hornomoravský úval and then the Lower Morava Valley or Dolnomoravský úval in Moravia, the Morava Field or Marchfeld in Lower Austria, and the Záhorie Lowland or Záhorská nížina in Slovakia. The latter three are actually continuous parts of one large basin, forming the major part of the Vienna Basin.

In the Czech Republic, there are some larger towns lying upon Morava, particularly Olomouc, Kroměříž, Otrokovice, Uherské Hradiště and Hodonín. Brno, the second largest city of Czech Republic, lies within the river basin. The catchment area of the river has a population of  3,5 million people. Downstream from Hodonín, the river flows along sparsely inhabited, forested border area, all the way to its outfall into the Danube, just below the Devín Castle at the outskirts of the Slovak capital Bratislava.

The river's longest tributary by far is the Thaya (in German) or Dyje (in Czech), flowing in at the tripoint of Austria, the Czech Republic and Slovakia. The confluence of Thaya and Morava is the southernmost and the lowest point of Moravia. The biggest tributary from the left is Bečva.

The Morava is a lowland river with a basin that consists to 51 percent of plains; mountains make up only seven percent of the basin while 35 percent are considered highland. The average slope of the river is 1.8‰ and at the confluence 4‰. The bedrock of the river basin is mostly crystalline bedrock and flysch.

The Morava river is unusual in that it is a European blackwater river.

Course of the river

Ecology
The Morava river forms an important link between the Danube Valley and the plains of northern Europe, for animals as well as, at least historically, for humans. Its weak slope across flat plains furthermore means that the river is prone to meander and flood, creating vast floodplains. Because of these reasons, the floodplains of the Morava river are among the most biologically diverse ecosystems in Europe. Its richness in plant and animal species (some 12,000 species have been identified) ranks it second in diversity only to the Danube Delta. During the 20th century however, large tracts of the river, especially downstream from Litovel, have been regulated with the ensuing effect of loss of inundation areas (floodplains). Since the river basin is densely populated and, especially the Czech part, industrialised, the river also receives a lot of wastewater. Agriculture also contributes to spreading nitrogen and other nutrients into the river. Nevertheless, the central part of the river has retained much of its natural character and in later years conscious efforts have been made to protect the nature and ecosystem of the river basin.

Ecology of the river

See also
March of Austria
March of Moravia

References

External links 

 

 
Austria–Slovakia border
Czech Republic–Slovakia border
International rivers of Europe
Moravia
Rivers of Lower Austria
Rivers of Slovakia
Rivers of the Olomouc Region
Rivers of the Pardubice Region
Rivers of the South Moravian Region
Rivers of the Zlín Region
Rivers of Austria
Border rivers